Events in the year 1949 in Bulgaria.

Incumbents 

 General Secretaries of the Bulgarian Communist Party: Georgi Dimitrov (from 1946 until July 2) Valko Chervenkov (from July 2 until 1954)
 Chairmen of the Council of Ministers: Georgi Dimitrov (from 1946 until July 2) Vasil Kolarov (ad interim; from July 2 until 1950)

Events 

 18 December – Parliamentary elections were held in Bulgaria.

Sports

References 

 
1940s in Bulgaria
Years of the 20th century in Bulgaria
Bulgaria
Bulgaria